The Mercedes-Benz CLK-Class is a former series of mid-size or entry-level luxury coupés and convertibles produced by Mercedes-Benz between 1997 and 2010. Although its design and styling was derived from the E-Class, the mechanical underpinnings were based on the smaller C-Class, and was positioned between the Mercedes-Benz SLK-Class and CL-Class. It primarily competes with the two-door BMW 3 and 6 Series, as well as the Audi A4 Cabriolet and the Maserati Coupe and its convertible variant.

In 2010, Mercedes moved the CLK-Class designation back to the E-Class, as it had been called previously.

First generation (C208/A208; 1997–2003) 

The first-generation C208/A208 CLK was introduced in 1997, and was based on the W202 Mercedes-Benz C-Class launched three years earlier. The W208 coupé was replaced by the W209 CLK-Class in 2002 (for the 2003 model year), although the convertible remained in production until 2003 when replaced by the C209 CLK.

History 
The CLK introduced a new market niche for Mercedes-Benz. Although the W208 used components from the E-Class (W210), aesthetic based on the E-Class and had a specification level higher than the E-Class, it was in fact based on the less expensive C-Class (W202) platform.

Two versions were initially available: the four-cylinder CLK 200 and four-cylinder supercharged CLK 230 Kompressor .

The CLK 320 Coupé was introduced in the 1997 model year, powered by a  3.2 L V6 engine. The CLK GTR FIA GT1 racing car appeared in 1998, powered by a 5.9 L V12 engine; 25 road-going CLK GTRs were made. All models were available in both coupé and convertible form. 

In late 1999 for the 2000 model year, a facelift was launched which incorporated, among others, a revised instrument cluster with a bigger multifunction display, steering wheel with controls for the multifunction display and radio, Tiptronic automatic gearbox, revised bumpers and new side skirts. Wing mirror-mounted turn signals were implemented in 2001 for the 2002 year model.

In the United States, the CLK 430 could be equipped with a "Sport Package," which gave it the external styling of the more powerful CLK 55 AMG, and equipped it with the same wheels and tires as its AMG counterpart (see section "CLK 55 AMG"). This allowed it to reach up to 0.83G's of lateral acceleration, and 66.5 mph on the slalom run. 

Since the CLK 55 AMG Cabriolet didn't officially release until 2002. In 2001 the CLK 430 Cabriolet could be equipped with all the AMG options as a special order from the AMG factory with the full 55 AMG setup, which includes the CLK 55 AMG engine and transmission, AMG suspension, AMG brakes and full set up as a factory option. Making it the first 2001 CLK 55 AMG Cabriolet. Although only a very few were built.

The high-performance CLK 55 AMG, which was introduced first in Europe in 2000, was powered by the  M113 5.4 L V8 engine; the CLK 55 AMG Cabriolet was launched in 2002, the last model year of this bodystyle.

Pre-facelift styling

Post-facelift styling

CLK55 AMG

Engine 
The CLK 55 AMG is powered by a hand-assembled 5.4-litre V8 engine. The hardware list includes super-stiff forged billet steel crankshaft, forged, weight-matched connecting rods and pistons, lightweight AMG-specific chain-driven single overhead camshafts V8 (one cam per cylinder bank) with two intake and one exhaust valves per cylinder, as well as 8 coil packs and 16 spark plugs (two spark plugs per cylinder). Its bore and stroke are 97mm × 92mm. The 'dual-resonance' intake manifold with tuned runners helps optimize torque and power output by taking advantage of what Mercedes calls 'resonant frequencies'. The engine has a high compression ratio of 10.5:1.

Transmission 
The five-speed automatic transmission (722.6) is adapted from the gearbox used in the V-12 S-class models, because that gearbox can take the torque. It is fully adaptive and electronically controlled, and is a stronger unit than that of the CLK 430. Also a larger four-bolt driveshaft that's four inches in diameter connects to a reinforced rear differential to keep all the extra power under control. Standard traction control keeps wheelspin to a minimum, while its Electronic Stability Program (ESP) keeps the CLK on its intended path.

Handling 
The standard CLK chassis is used, and while the current version is not based on the new C-Class platform, the AMG version of the CLK offers some special undercarriage components. The four-wheel independent suspension is basically the same as the lesser CLK versions, but AMG fits higher-rated springs, tighter shock valving, larger diameter anti-roll bars and stiffer suspension bushings. The resulting firmer, more controlled ride is made even tighter by its high-performance ZR-rated low-profile tires. The brakes have been enhanced as well. The huge four-wheel discs are larger and thicker than the other CLKs, and the rear discs are specially vented to enhance cooling. An anti-lock braking system (ABS) is standard, while Brake Assist applies full braking force in panic stop faster than a driver could. It rides on AMG Monoblock alloy wheels, 7.5" front and 8.5" rear, shod with 225/45ZR17 and 245/40ZR17 Michelin Pilot Sport tires.

CLK GTR 

The Mercedes-Benz CLK-GTR was a V12 mid-engine race car developed for the 1997 FIA GT Championship. It shared only the instrumentation, front grille and the four headlamps with the normal CLK C208. Production of the required 25 road cars began in winter of 1998 and finished in the summer of 1999.

CLK DTM 

The Mercedes-Benz CLK DTM was a race version of the CLK developed for the 2000 DTM season.

F1 safety car 
A specially modified version of the CLK 55 AMG was used during the 1997 F1 season as a safety car. Which also served as the bases for the further modified version of the CLK 55 AMG race car built by AMG for the Targa Tasmania Race in 2001.

Engines and performance

Second generation (C209/A209; 2003–2010) 

The Mercedes-Benz C209/A209 is the second generation CLK-Class, and was launched in 2002 with production starting in June. The car was available in both hardtop coupé (C209) and in soft-top convertible form (A209), with a choice of petrol and diesel engines. At introduction, a 2.6-litre V6, a 3.2-litre V6, 5.0-litre V8, 5.4-litre V8, and 2.7L inline-5 diesel engine was available. In 2010, the CLK lineup was discontinued and replaced by the C207 E-Class coupé and A207 E-Class convertible.

Successor (C207/A207; 2010–2017) 

The C207/A207 E-Class was introduced as part of the new fourth-generation E-Class lineup, and was first shown at the 2009 Geneva Motor Show. It is based on the W204 C-Class platform, but shares 60% of its parts with the E-Class sedan and wagon. In 2013, the C207/A207 received a facelift, featuring updated design changes and performance and fuel economy improvements.

Sales figures 
The following are the sales figures in Europe and in the United States:

References

Notes

Bibliography 

 
 
 
 
 
 
 
 
 
 
 
 
 
 
 

CLK-Class
Coupés
Convertibles
Grand tourers
Rear-wheel-drive vehicles
Cars introduced in 1997
2000s cars